The Superleague Formula round Netherlands is a round of the Superleague Formula. The Netherlands and TT Circuit Assen didn't host an event until 2010, the third season of the series.

Winners

References

External links
 Superleague Formula Official Website
 V12 Racing: Independent Superleague Formula Fansite Magazine

Netherlands